1447 Utra, provisional designation , is a stony asteroid, slow rotator and suspected tumbler from the central region of the asteroid belt, approximately 12 kilometers in diameter. It was discovered on 26 January 1938, by Finnish astronomer Yrjö Väisälä at Turku Observatory in Southwest Finland. The asteroid was named for the Finnish town of Utra (now a part of Joensuu).

Orbit and classification 

Utra is a S-type asteroid. It orbits the Sun in the central main-belt at a distance of 2.4–2.6 AU once every 4.04 years (1,474 days). Its orbit has an eccentricity of 0.04 and an inclination of 5° with respect to the ecliptic. The body's observation arc begins with its official discovery observation at Turku in 1938.

Physical characteristics

Slow rotator 

In March 2011, a rotational lightcurve of Utra was obtained from photometric observations by astronomer Luis E. Martinez. Lightcurve analysis gave a long rotation period of 257 hours with a brightness variation of 0.63 magnitude. This slow rotator is also a suspected tumbler (T0).

Diameter and albedo 

According to the surveys carried out by the Japanese Akari satellite and NASA's Wide-field Infrared Survey Explorer with its subsequent NEOWISE mission, Utra measures between 11.83 and 13.26 kilometers in diameter, and its surface has an albedo between 0.303 and 0.381. The Collaborative Asteroid Lightcurve Link assumes a standard albedo for stony asteroids of 0.20 and calculates a diameter of 13.58 kilometers with an absolute magnitude of 11.7.

Naming 

This minor planet was named for Utra, a northeastern Finnish town and birthplace of the discoverer. The official  was published by the Minor Planet Center on 30 January 1964.

Notes

References

External links 
 Asteroid Lightcurve Database (LCDB), query form (info )
 Dictionary of Minor Planet Names, Google books
 Asteroids and comets rotation curves, CdR – Observatoire de Genève, Raoul Behrend
 Discovery Circumstances: Numbered Minor Planets (1)-(5000) – Minor Planet Center
 
 

 

001447
Discoveries by Yrjö Väisälä
Named minor planets
001447
19380126